Kopači is a village in the municipality of Novo Goražde, Republika Srpska, Bosnia and Herzegovina. According to the 2013 census, the village has 146 inhabitants.

References 

Populated places in Novo Goražde
Villages in Republika Srpska